Rina Ronja Kari (born 15 February 1985) is a Danish politician and was a Member of the European Parliament (MEP) from Denmark. She is a member of the People's Movement against the EU, part of the European United Left–Nordic Green Left.

She replaced Søren Søndergaard as MEP for the People's Movement against the EU and is associated member of GUE/NGL. She was elected to the European Parliament in May 2014, and lost her seat in May 2019.

External links
 Rina Ronja Kari official website

1985 births
Living people
Euroscepticism in Denmark
People's Movement against the EU MEPs
MEPs for Denmark 2014–2019
21st-century women MEPs for Denmark
Politicians from Copenhagen